Ripartites is a genus of fungi in the family Tricholomataceae. The genus has a widespread distribution and originally contained five species. Species in Ripartites have small, round to subglobose spores, which are yellowish-brown and ornamented. Macroscopically, they resemble Clitocybe. Ripartites was circumscribed by Petter Karsten in 1879.

The genus name of Ripartites is in honour of Jean Baptiste Marie Joseph Solange Eugène Ripart (1815–1878), who was a French physician, botanist and mycologist. 

Previously unknown sesquiterpenes have been isolated from Ripartites metrodii and Ripartites tricholoma.

Species
As accepted by Species Fungorum;
 Ripartites albidoincarnatus 
 Ripartites amparae 
 Ripartites flabellatus 
 Ripartites krieglsteineri 
 Ripartites metrodii 
 Ripartites odorus 
 Ripartites serotina 
 Ripartites tricholoma

Former species
 R. scambus  = Pholiota scamba within the Strophariaceae family

See also

List of Tricholomataceae genera

References

External links

Tricholomataceae
Agaricales genera
Taxa named by Petter Adolf Karsten